Zalloutieh   is a local authority in Southern Lebanon, located in Tyre District, Governorate of South Lebanon. It is a Sunni Muslim village.

Name
According to E. H. Palmer, Kh. Zallûtiyeh means the ruin of pebbles.

History
In 1881, the PEF's Survey of Western Palestine (SWP) found "large heaps of small stones" at Kh. Zallûtiyeh.

Presently, Zalloutieh is listed as a Lebanese local authority in the Tyre District.

References

Bibliography

External links
 Zalloutieh, Localiban
Survey of Western Palestine, Map 3:  IAA, Wikimedia commons  

Populated places in Tyre District
Sunni Muslim communities in Lebanon